The Talas (Kyrgyz) is a river that rises in the Talas Region of Kyrgyzstan and flows west into Kazakhstan.

Course
It is formed from the confluence of the Karakol and Uch-Koshoy and flows roughly westwards and northwestwards. It runs through the city of Taraz in Zhambyl Province of Kazakhstan and vanishes in the Muyunkum Desert before reaching Lake Aydyn.

The Ili, Chu and Talas are three steppe rivers that flow west and then north-west.  The Ili rises in Xinjiang, flows west to a point north of Lake Issyk Kul and then turns north-west to reach Lake Balkash.  The Chu rises west of Lake Issyk Kul, flows out into the steppe and dries up before reaching the Syr Darya. The Talas starts west and south of the Chu, flows west and north-west, but dries up before reaching the Chu.

History

During the Battle of Talas (named after the river) in 751, the Abbasid force defeated the Tang Chinese forces led by the General Gao Xianzhi over a dispute regarding a client kingdom in the Fergana Valley. The battle was won by the Abbasids after the Karluks defected.

The Chinese monk Xuanzang arrived from the Chui river to Talas during one of his journeys.

References

Rivers of Kazakhstan
Rivers of Kyrgyzstan
Jambyl Region
Talas Region
International rivers of Asia